The Great Britain men's national water polo team is the representative for Great Britain in international men's water polo. The team has participated in eleven tournaments at the Summer Olympics, being the dominant team in the sport in the early twentieth century, with four Olympic titles. The only major competition they have ever qualified for was the first world championships in 1973. They qualified for the London 2012 Olympics by virtue of their representing the host country.

Results

Olympic Games

1900 —  Gold medal
1908 —  Gold medal
1912 —  Gold medal
1920 —  Gold medal
1924 — 1st round (8th place)
1928 — 4th place
1936 — 8th place
1948 — First round (13th place)
1952 — Second round (12th place)
1956 — 7th place
2012 — 12th place

World Championship
1973 — 15th place

Current roster

See also
 Great Britain men's Olympic water polo team records and statistics
 List of Olympic champions in men's water polo
 List of men's Olympic water polo tournament records and statistics

References

Men's national water polo teams